Palpada is a genus of 85 neotropical and nearctic flower flies or hoverflies
This genus is often colorful and bee-like. It is in the tribe Eristaliini containing dozens of genera  Common sister genera include Eristalis (99 species), Meromacrus (43 sp.), Eristalinus (100 sp.) and Helophilus (50 sp.).
The genus palpada is distinguished by: 
Eyes with uniform pile. 
Meron with fine pale hairs in front of or below spiracle.
Hind femur with basal patch of dense black setulae. 
Cell r2+3 closed before wing margin.
 R4+5 moderately to strongly dipped into cell r4+5. 

The larvae are aquatic and have a distinctive shape, usually being referred to as rat-tailed. The rat-tail is a breathng tube that allows the larvae to live in low oxygen water.

Species

References

External links

Genus Palpada on BugGuide

Diptera of North America
Diptera of South America
Hoverfly genera
Eristalinae
Taxa named by Pierre-Justin-Marie Macquart
Hoverflies of North America